Curt Einar Hjelm (3 November 1913 – 5 October 1988) was a Swedish footballer who played as a forward. He played his club football for IK Sleipner and also featured twice for the Sweden national team in 1939, scoring two goals. He was the Allsvenskan top scorer when Sleipner won the 1937–38 Allsvenskan title.

Career statistics

International

Scores and results list Sweden's goal tally first, score column indicates score after each Hjelm goal.

Honours 
Sleipner
 Allsvenskan: 1937–38

Individual
 Allsvenskan top scorer:  1937–38

References

1913 births
1988 deaths
Swedish footballers
Association football forwards
Sweden international footballers
IK Sleipner players